Warnerville is an unincorporated community in Madison County, Nebraska, United States.

History
A post office was established at Warnerville in 1887, and remained in operation until it was discontinued in 1917. The community was named for H. Warner, a local businessman.

References

Unincorporated communities in Madison County, Nebraska
Unincorporated communities in Nebraska